Claude-Mathias Phaneuf (1690–1773), born Matthias Farnsworth III, was an English prisoner of war, French citizen, and progenitor of the family name Phaneuf. He was abducted from near his home in Groton in 1704 by Abenaki warriors and taken to Montreal during Queen Anne's War.

Biography

Early life and family

The Farnsworth family originated from England. Matthias Farnsworth is believed to have emigrated and was first recorded settled in Lynn, Massachusetts in 1657. Although the exact timeline is unclear, he married Mary Farr of Lynn before moving to Groton in 1660. He died in 1689 at "about 77 years of age". His son, Matthias Farnsworth, Jr. married Sarah Nutting in Groton and had 4 children before he died in 1693.  Matthias Jr. participated in the Siege of Brookfield under Major Willard.

Matthias Farnsworth III was born in Groton in 1690. During his life, Groton was subject to numerous attacks and multiple other children were abducted, including Lydia Longley. Around the time of his 14th birthday, Matthias III was taken from his home by an Abenaki raiding party and brought to Montreal. 

Matthias III's nephew Ebenezer was similarly taken from Charlestown, New Hampshire along with Susannah Willard Johnson and is featured in her memoir A Narrative of the Captivity of Mrs. Johnson.

Life in France

Late in 1704, Matthias arrived in Sault-au-Recollet and was admitted to the mission at Fort Lorette by François Vachon de Belmont.  
At the mission, boys were educated by Sulpician missionaries while the girls were educated by the sisters of the Congregation of Notre Dame.  For most children taken to Sault-au-Recollet, it was a temporary stay until they could be returned to their families.  Matthias stayed at the mission and converted to Catholicism, just as Lydia Longley had done 10 years before.

Matthias was baptized Mathias-Claude Farneth on Jan 10, 1706, and had as his godfather Claude de Ramezay and as his godmother Elisabeth Souart, wife of Charles le Moyne de Longueuil, Baron de Longueuil. Although it was usually the case that children would live with their godparents, Mathias remained at the mission. In October, 1706 he petitioned the crown for naturalization under the name Mathieu Claude Farnets. In 1711, he was given a land grant of 40 arpents by the Sulpicians, the grant citing his service at the mission. He was given a ribbon farm on the north end of the island, adjacent to Jean Carpentier and his family. 

In September 1713, Mathias signed a contract to marry Catherine Charpentier, his neighbor's daughter, as Claude Mathias Fanef. The contract was also signed by Claude de Ramezay and Vachon de Belmont as witnesses. They married a month later at St Joseph's parish with Fr Robert Gay presiding. They had 12 children. Later in life, they moved to Saint-Antoine-sur-Richelieu where Mathias died in 1773. His tombstone reads Claude-Mathias Phaneuf.

Variations on the Name

The numerous spellings of his name come from a combination of the original pronunciation of Farnsworth, his presumed illiteracy at 14, and the language barrier with the French. The original pronunciation of his name was roughly FAR-noth, which was transliterated in New France as Farneth. It transformed over time and was spelled in various records as Farnets, Fanef, Faneuf, and Phaneuf.

References

People of New France
People_of_Queen_Anne's_War
1690 births
1773 deaths
Converts_to_Roman_Catholicism